Soulful Dress is a blues album by Marcia Ball. It is Ball's second solo album. Soulful Dress was released in 1984 through Rounder Records. Stevie Ray Vaughan played the first guitar solo on "Soulful Dress".

Critical reception
The Rolling Stone Album Guide wrote that "blues ballads and contemporary honky-tonk stylings further recommend an album that is both personally revealing and musically swinging." Nashville Scene called the album "one of the decade’s most nuanced explorations of New Orleans-style R&B."

Track listing
All songs written by Marcia Ball except as noted.
"Soulful Dress" (Maurice McAlister, Terry Vail) – 3:16
"Make Your Move Too Soon" – 3:19
"I'd Rather Go Blind" (Billy Foster, Ellington Jordan) – 5:08
"Jailbird" (Dave Bartholomew) – 2:58
"Eugene" – 3:44
"My Mind's Made Up" – 2:29
"A Thousand Times" – 3:25
"That's Why I Love You" (Moore) – 3:33
"Soul on Fire" (LaVern Baker, Ahmet Ertegün, Jerry Wexler) – 4:46
"Don't Want No Man" – 3:00

Personnel
Piano, Vocals – Marcia Ball
Bass – Don Bennett
Drums – Wes Starr
Guitar – Kenny Ray, Stevie Ray Vaughan
Horns – The Mighty Big Horns (Keith Winking, Kent Winking, Pat Mackrell)
Organ – Nick Connolly
Tenor Saxophone, Alto Saxophone – Mark Kazanoff

References

1984 albums
Blues albums by American artists
Marcia Ball albums
Albums produced by Denny Bruce
Rounder Records albums